General Muhammad Yusaf Khan  (born February 10, 1948) was a senior general of the Pakistan Army who served as the Vice Chief of Army Staff (VCOAS) from October 8, 2001 until October 7, 2004. Following the end of his 3-year term in October 2004, he was succeeded by General Ahsan Saleem Hyat.

Military career
General Yusaf Khan graduated from Military College Jhelum (College No. 2642), He was commissioned in the Pakistan Army in 1966 in the 37th PMA Long Course and joined the Guides Cavalry. He served various command and staff posts including Commanding Officer Guides Cavalry, Commanding Officer of a Tank Battalion in Saudi Arabia, Instructor at Command and Staff College, Chief of Staff of a Strike Corps, Commander of an armoured division, Chief of General Staff, and finally the Vice Chief of Army Staff of the Pakistan Army.

Yusaf Khan was promoted to Lieutenant General in June 1998 and sent as the Military Secretary (MS) in the GHQ. Later on 29 October 1998, he was transferred as Commander II Corps, Multan.

Military coup of 1999 and Chief of General Staff
During the time of military coup of 1999, the then Lieutenant General Muhammad Yusaf Khan was the Corps Commander Multan. By September 2000, he was posted as Chief of General Staff (CGS) to replace the then Lieutenant General Aziz Khan who was instead given the command of Lahore Corps. The post of Chief of General Staff is considered vital as the chief overlooks the two intelligence bureaus within Pakistan Army (Military Intelligence and Intelligence Bureau).

Vice Chief of Army Staff
In October 2001, General Yusaf was promoted to four-star general as the Vice Chief of Army Staff. He was junior only to Usmani, hence superseding one officer while ascending to the four-star post of VCOAS. The timing of promotion of General Yusaf and General Aziz Khan coincided with the US invasion of Afghanistan, when these generals superseded Lieutenant General Muzaffar Usmani and Lieutenant General Mahmud Ahmed, both of whom were known for their hawkish stances.

General Yusaf also stayed the ceremonial post of Colonel-in-Chief of the Armoured Corps of Pakistan Army. The four-star general is usually promoted as the Colonel-in-Chief of his respective unit. He was promoted to that position by President General Pervez Musharraf on 31 March 2003 at the Armoured Corps Regimental Center in Nowshera and continued till 3 May 2005 when he was replaced by General Ahsan Saleem Hyat.

Awards and decorations

Foreign Decorations

References

External links
 Launching ceremony of "Men of Steel"

 

|-
 

Pakistani generals
1948 births
Living people
Pakistan Armoured Corps officers